Government Engineering College Munger is a engineering college in Munger district of Bihar. It was established in the year 2019 under Department of Science and Technology, Bihar. It is affiliated with Aryabhatta Knowledge University and approved by All India Council for Technical Education.

Chief Minister Nitish Kumar laid the foundation stone and inaugurated the institution from the Polo Field, Munger. It is approved and recognized by AICTE and is affiliated with Aryabhatta Knowledge University in Patna. Government Engineering College Munger was established as a part of the "Saat Nichshay Yojana" of the Bihar Government with the aim of providing quality higher education in the field of Engineering and Technology on par with National Standards.

The greenery and the ambiance of the campus keep the students cheerful and will have an enjoyable learning experience. College is offering B.Tech. courses in civil engineering with an intake of 120, Mechanical Engineering with an intake of 60,Computer Science Engineering(Artificial Intelligence) with an intake of 60 and Electrical Engineering with an intake of 60.

Admission 
Admission in the college for four years Bachelor of Technology course is made through UGEAC conducted by Bihar Combined Entrance Competitive Examination Board. To apply for UGEAC, appearing in JEE Main of that admission year is required along with other eligibility criteria.

Departments 

College have four branches in Bachelor of Technology course.

References

External links 

 BCECE Board website
 Aryabhatta Knowledge University website
 DST, Bihar website

Engineering colleges in Bihar
Colleges affiliated to Aryabhatta Knowledge University
2019 establishments in Bihar
Educational institutions established in 2019